"Let's Take It to the Stage" is a song by Funkadelic, the title track to their 1975 album Let's Take It to the Stage. It
was written by George Clinton, Bootsy Collins and Garry Shider, with lead vocals by Clinton. The lyrics consist of mockery of other popular bands, risqué nursery rhymes, and stream-of-consciousness-style rapping.

Lyrics
The title of the song, sung as "let's take it to the stage, sucker", is a challenge to other popular bands, inviting them to participate in a "battle of the bands". (See Cutting contest and Battle rap.) Several bands are "called out" in the song:
James Brown, known as "The Godfather of Soul" — "Talking 'bout you the Godfather. Godmother! Grandfather!" Also referred to as "James Clown."
Earth, Wind & Fire — "Earth, Hot Air & No Fire"
Kool & the Gang —  "Fool & the Gang"
Rufus and their hit "Tell Me Something Good" — "Hey Sloofus! Tell Me Something Good!"
Sly Stone and Sly & the Family Stone — "Slick Brick" and "Slick and the Family Brick"
Some of the song's lyrics seem similar to an old folk rhyme that was first published in Thomas W. Talley's Negro Folk Rhymes (Wise or Otherwise) (1922):

"Tricky Dick wasn't worried about no incriminating Watergate information being on those tapes. That sucker didn't want y'all to dig on him trying to cop an ounce of that P-blow!"
President Richard Nixon was often referred to mockingly as "Tricky Dick".
"Watergate" was a series of political scandals that involved political espionage and sabotage, illegal break-ins, wiretapping, and obstruction of justice. The Watergate scandal led to Nixon's resignation in 1974. During the Watergate investigation, it was revealed that Nixon had a tape recording system in his White House offices and that he had recorded many conversations.
"Incriminating ... information ... on those tapes" refers to the mysterious 18½ minute gap that had been erased from the tapes Nixon provided to Watergate investigators. Since the discovery of the gap in 1973, there has been a great deal of speculation regarding the conversation that had been erased, and why it was considered so embarrassing that somebody chose to erase it.
"P-blow" could refer to P-Funk (that is, Nixon was listening to P-Funk) or cocaine, commonly referred to as "blow".

1975 songs
Funkadelic songs
Songs written by George Clinton (funk musician)
Songs written by Bootsy Collins